The Complete Mozart Edition  is a 180-CD collection released in 1990–91 featuring all works by Wolfgang Amadeus Mozart (known at the set's publication) assembled by Philips Classics Records to commemorate the bicentenary of the death of Mozart (December 5, 1791). It has been re-released in 2000 in a modified version as the Complete Compact Mozart Edition.

Overview
The Complete Mozart Edition  comprises 180 compact discs arranged into 45 themed volumes.

Each volume in the series is accompanied by a deluxe booklet with detailed information about the works, with many illustrations. Indicating the significance of this particular series, the words of the accompanying Compactotheque state, "...after the complete Shakespeare, the complete Goethe, or the complete Molière in book form, here is the Complete Mozart on discs."

A modified version of The Complete Mozart Edition, the Complete Compact Mozart Edition, was released in 2000. It consists of 17 individual boxed sets. This version also contains stripped down versions of the booklets that accompanied the original series.

The Complete Mozart Edition and The Complete Compact Mozart Edition are both accompanied by a 200-page booklet which presents a condensed biography of Mozart with many photographs, describes in detail all boxes content and contains a complete index of all the musical works following the Köchel catalogue.

This set is not to be confused with the similar complete edition (on 170 CDs) by Brilliant Classics entitled Complete Works.

In addition, a boxed set entitled The Best of the Complete Mozart Edition was also released on November 14, 1995. This set contains 25 compact discs and represents a selection of the 1990–91 or 2000 sets.

The original The Complete Mozart series

The Complete Compact Mozart Edition

References

Philips Classics Records albums
1990 classical albums
1991 classical albums
2000 classical albums
Wolfgang Amadeus Mozart
Classical music compilation albums